Inbioxa is a genus of moths in the family Blastobasidae. It contains only one species, Inbioxa epithecae, which is found in Costa Rica.

References

Blastobasidae genera
Monotypic moth genera
Moths of Central America